Wanrong County is a county under the administration of Yuncheng City, in the southwest of Shanxi Province, China, bordering Shaanxi province to the west.

The county's Gushan was credited by the Records of Yicheng County compiled during the Qianlong Era of the Qing as being the actual "Mianshan" mentioned in the legends of Jie Zhitui concerning the origins of the Cold Food Festival, rather than the Mt Mian in Jinzhong Prefecture.

Sui Dynasty Confucian philosopher Wang Tong was born in Longmen County, modern day Tonghua Township.

Climate

References

Citations

Bibliography
 .

External links
 . 

 
County-level divisions of Shanxi